Tofano is an Italian surname. Notable people with the surname include:

 Edoardo Tofano (1838-1920), Italian painter 
 Rosetta Tofano (1902–1960), Italian costume designer and film star
 Sergio Tòfano (1886–1973), Italian actor, director, playwright, scene designer and illustrator
 Tecla Tofano (1927–1995), Venezuelan artist, ceramicist, and writer

Italian-language surnames